Pekka Tapani Marjamäki (18 December 1947 – 10 May 2012) was an ice hockey player who played in the SM-liiga. He played for Tappara.

Marjamäki also played for HV 71 during the 1979–80 season. He was inducted into the Finnish Hockey Hall of Fame in 1990 and in the IIHF Hall of Fame in 1998.

Marjamäki had a heart attack when returning home from the supermarket on 7 May 2012. He was hospitalised and died in the intensive care unit of the hospital of Tampere during the early hours of 10 May.

References

External links 
 Finnish Hockey Hall of Fame page

1947 births
2012 deaths
Finnish ice hockey defencemen
HV71 players
Ice hockey players at the 1972 Winter Olympics
Ice hockey players at the 1976 Winter Olympics
Ice hockey players with retired numbers
IIHF Hall of Fame inductees
Olympic ice hockey players of Finland
Ice hockey people from Tampere
Tappara players